Rough House or roughhouse may refer to:

 Rough House (album), an album released in 1978 by jazz musician John Scofield
 Roughhouse, a comic book supervillain in the Marvel Comics universe
 Rough House, the grumpy chef in the comic strip Popeye
 Rough House, an anglicization of Rauhes Haus, a home for orphans in Hamburg, Germany
 The Rough House, a 1917 film starring Fatty Arbuckle and Buster Keaton